Brazeau County is a municipal district in central Alberta, Canada. It is located in Census Division 11. The municipal district was incorporated on July 1, 1988 from Improvement District No. 222. On October 1, 2002, the name was changed from Municipal District of Brazeau No. 77 to Brazeau County.

It is named for the Brazeau River, in turn named for Joseph Brazeau, a linguist associated with the Palliser Expedition.

History 
Brazeau County encompasses an area that was originally under the jurisdiction of three neighbouring municipalities. In the mid-1980s, residents of the southwest portion of Parkland County and the west portion of Leduc County were growing weary of perceived poor service provision as a result of being located significant distances from their municipal headquarters in Stony Plain and Leduc respectively. After much lobbying and petitions over approximately five years, lands were severed from Parkland County and Leduc County, as well as a small portion of Yellowhead County to the west, to create Improvement District No. 222 on December 31, 1987, which incorporated as the Municipal District of Brazeau No. 77 six months later on July 1, 1988. The municipality subsequently changed its name to Brazeau County on October 1, 2002.

Geography

Communities and localities 
The following urban municipalities are surrounded by Brazeau County.
Cities
none
Towns
Drayton Valley
Villages
Breton
Summer villages
none

The following hamlets are located within Brazeau County.
Hamlets
Buck Creek
Cynthia
Lodgepole
Poplar Ridge
Rocky Rapids
Violet Grove

The following localities are located within Brazeau County.
Localities 

Alsike
Antross
Beaver Estates
Berrymoor
Birch Field Estates
Birchwood Village Greens
Boggy Hall
Brazeau Dam
Carnwood
Cottonwood Subdivision
Country Classic Estates
Country Style Trailer Court
Easyford

Fairway Meadows
Lindale
Meadow Land Acres
Parview Estates
Pembina
Pleasant View
Rex Block
River Ridge Subdivision
Round Valley
Valley Drive
Valley Drive Acres
West Bank Acres

Demographics 

In the 2016 Census of Population conducted by Statistics Canada, Brazeau County had a population of 7,771 living in 2,930 of its 3,194 total private dwellings, a  change from its 2011 population of 7,132.

See also 
List of communities in Alberta
List of municipal districts in Alberta

References

External links 

 
Municipal districts in Alberta